The Magic Bedknob; or, How to Become a Witch in Ten Easy Lessons is a 1944 children's book by Mary Norton. The book was later adapted into the Disney movie Bedknobs and Broomsticks.

Synopsis
While spending the summer in Bedfordshire, England, Carey, Charles, and Paul, meet Miss Price, the old spinster next door. When Paul sees Miss Price riding a broomstick, the children realize she is a witch. In return for their silence, Miss Price casts a spell on a knob from the bed so that when the knob is turned, the bed will fly wherever they wish to go. The children take the bed on various magical adventures.

Omnibus
The book and its 1947 sequel Bonfires and Broomsticks were combined into the omnibus Bedknob and Broomstick in 1957, illustrated by Erik Blegvad.

References

1944 children's books
1944 British novels
1944 fantasy novels
British children's novels
British novels adapted into films
Fiction about alchemy
Fiction set in 1942
1944 debut novels
Children's fantasy novels
J. M. Dent books
G. P. Putnam's Sons books
Novels set in Bedfordshire